Jutta Krüger (born 22 August 1932) is a German athlete. She competed in the women's javelin throw at the 1952 Summer Olympics.

References

External links

1932 births
Possibly living people
Athletes (track and field) at the 1952 Summer Olympics
German female javelin throwers
Olympic athletes of Germany
Athletes from Berlin